The 2022–23 PBA season or PBA Season 47 is the 47th season of the Philippine Basketball Association. For the first time in two seasons, the league will return to its regular three-conference format, starting with the Philippine Cup. The Commissioner's and Governors' Cups are the second and third conferences in the upcoming season.

After the PBA adjusted its calendar again, the association's 47th season was set to start on June 5, 2022, and scheduled to end on May 10, 2023. Also for the first time since 2017 the season will span two calendar years.
The first activity of the season was the PBA Season 47 draft, held on May 15, 2022.

Executive board
 Commissioner: Willie Marcial
 Chairman: Ricky Vargas (Representing TNT Tropang Giga)
 Vice-Chairman: Demosthenes Rosales (Representing Terrafirma Dyip)
 Treasurer: Raymond Zorrilla (Representing Phoenix Super LPG Fuel Masters)

Teams 
Changes from 2021:
 Alaska Aces franchise bought out by Converge ICT, to become as the Converge FiberXers.
 Bay Area Dragons, franchise team for the East Asia Super League, played in the Commissioner's Cup as a guest team.

Arenas 
With the relaxation of government restrictions related to the COVID-19 pandemic, the PBA has returned to playing to different Metro Manila venues. The PBA plans to return to playing games in the provinces, plus an out-of-the-country game, during the Governors' Cup. 

Game 7 of the Commissioner's Cup Finals is scheduled to be held at the Philippine Arena in Bocaue, Bulacan.

Transactions

Retirement

On June 1, 2022, Joe Devance announced his retirement from the PBA. Devance played for four teams in his 16 seasons in the league.
On June 7, 2022, Andre Paras announced his retirement from the PBA. Paras played for Blackwater Bossing for only one season.
On September 19, 2022, Paul Desiderio announced his retirement from the PBA. Desiderio played for the Blackwater Bossing franchise in his three seasons in the league.
On January 7, 2023, Larry Fonacier formally retires after being tapped by NLEX Road Warriors as its team manager. Fonacier played for five teams in his 15 seasons in the league.

Coaching changes 
There were no offseason coaching changes; all of the listed changes below occurred mid-season.

Rule changes 
The PBA competition committee approved the rule changes for implementation starting in the Philippine Cup games:

Notable events

Pre-season
 The PBA Board of Governors approved the return of the three-conference format this season.
 Ricky Vargas of TNT Tropang Giga was re-elected for a fifth consecutive term as the Chairman of the PBA Board of Governors. Bobby Rosales of Terrafirma Dyip was re-elected as Vice Chairman, while Raymond Zorilla of the Phoenix Super LPG Fuel Masters was elected as treasurer. Vargas is currently the longest-serving head of the PBA Board of Governors since the presidency of Ginebra San Miguel's Carlos "Honeyboy" Palanca III (1983 to 1986) and the chairmanship of Formula Shell's Reynaldo Marquez (1987 to 1990).

Philippine Cup
 The PBA D-League opened its first tournament, the 2022 Aspirant's Cup for the first time in two years on July 7.

Opening ceremonies
The opening ceremony for this season was held at the Smart Araneta Coliseum in Quezon City on June 5, 2022, hosted by Vhong Navarro and Gretchen Ho. The PBA Leo Awards for the 2021 season was held before the opening ceremonies. 

The first game of the Philippine Cup between the Converge FiberXers and the Rain or Shine Elasto Painters was played after the opening ceremonies.

Below is the list of team muses:

2022 PBA Philippine Cup

The Philippine Cup started on June 5 and ended on September 4, 2022.

Elimination round

Playoffs

Quarterfinals

|}

|}*Team has twice-to-beat advantage. Team 1 only has to win once, while Team 2 has to win twice.

Semifinals

|}

Finals

|}
 Finals MVP: June Mar Fajardo

2022–23 PBA Commissioner's Cup

The Commissioner's Cup started on September 21, 2022, and ended on January 15, 2023.

Elimination round

Playoffs

Quarterfinals

|}

|}*Team has twice-to-beat advantage. Team 1 only has to win once, while Team 2 has to win twice.

Semifinals

|}

Finals

|}
 Finals MVP: Christian Standhardinger

2023 PBA Governors' Cup

The Governors' Cup is scheduled to start on January 22, 2023.

Elimination round

PBA teams in Asian club competitions

3x3

The 3x3 season started on September 10, 2022.

First conference

Second conference

Third conference

References

External links
 PBA Official Website

 
Current basketball seasons
2022–23 in Philippine basketball leagues